Mawlawi may refer to:
Mawlawi Afzal (1920s–2012), Panjpiri-educated Afghan clergyman
Mawlawi Mehdi Mujahid (1988–2022), Hazara Shia rebel
Mawlawi Tawagozi, Kurdish poet and Sufi
Mevlevi Order, a Sufi order founded in Konya 
Mawlawi (Islamic title), an honorific Islamic title often given to Sunni Muslim clergy